Richard Timothy Sult is an American musician best known as the guitarist for rock band Clutch. He is also the guitarist for an instrumental side project, The Bakerton Group,  and an occasional member of the reggae rock / stoner rock band Lionize, as well as the band Deep Swell. Sult has remained the guitarist for Clutch since the group started in 1991.

References

External links 

Clutch's official website

Year of birth missing (living people)
Living people
Lead guitarists
American rock guitarists
Place of birth missing (living people)
American male guitarists
Clutch (band) members
The Bakerton Group members